Funtovo-1 is a rural locality (a selo) and the administrative center of Funtovsky Selsoviet, Privolzhsky District, Astrakhan Oblast, Russia. The population was 1,064 as of 2010. There are 55 streets.

Geography 
Funtovo-1 is located 21 km southwest of Nachalovo (the district's administrative centre) by road. Kirpichnogo zavoda #1 is the nearest rural locality.

References 

Rural localities in Privolzhsky District, Astrakhan Oblast